Agustín Ignacio Fiorilli (born October 8, 1978) is a freestyle swimmer from Argentina, who represented his native country at the two consecutive Summer Olympics, starting in 1996 (Atlanta, Georgia)

References
  Profile

Argentine male swimmers
Argentine male freestyle swimmers
Swimmers at the 1996 Summer Olympics
Swimmers at the 1999 Pan American Games
Swimmers at the 2000 Summer Olympics
Olympic swimmers of Argentina
1978 births
Living people
Sportspeople from Rosario, Santa Fe
Pan American Games competitors for Argentina
20th-century Argentine people